Ramnagar may refer to the following places:

Bangladesh 
 Ramnagar, Bangladesh, a village in Chittagong Division
 Ramnagar Union, Jessore Sadar

India

Jammu and Kashmir
 Ramnagar, Udhampur, a town in Jammu and Kashmir
 Ramnagar Fort Udhampur
 Ramnagar (Jammu and Kashmir Assembly constituency)

Karnataka 
 Ramanagara, a town in Karnataka
 Ramanagara district
Ramanagaram (Vidhana Sabha constituency)
 Ramnagar, Basavana Bagevadi, a village in Basavana Bagevadi Taluk, Bijapur district
 Ramanagar, Belgaum District, a village in Saundatti Taluk, Belgaum district
 Ramnagar, Bijapur, a village in Bijapur Taluk, Bijapur district
 Ramnagar, Gulbarga, a village in Afzalpur Taluk, Gulbarga district
 Ramanagar, Indi, a village in Indi Taluk, Bijapur district
 Ramnagar, Uttara Kannada, a village in Supa (Joida) Taluk, Uttara Kannada district
 Ramnagar, Yadgir, a village in Shorapur Taluk, Yadgir district

Uttar Pradesh 
 Ramnagar, Akhand Nagar, a village in Sultanpur district
 Ramnagar, Alapur, a town in Ambedkar Nagar district
 Ramnagar, Barabanki, a town in Barabanki district
 Ramnagar (Vidhan Sabha constituency)
 Ramnagar, Bareilly, a village in Bareilly district
 Ramnagar, Tiloi, a village Tiloi Taluk, in Rae Bareli district
 Ramnagar, Varanasi, a city in Varanasi district
 Ramnagar Fort

Uttarakhand 
 Ramnagar, Nainital, a town in Uttarakhand
 Ramnagar (Uttarakhand Assembly constituency)
 Ramnagar (NPP), a village in Ramnagar Taluk, Nainital district
 Ramnagar Range, Nainital, a village in Bajpur Taluk, Udham Singh Nagar district
 Ramnagar, Bajpur, a village in Bajpur Taluk, Udham Singh Nagar district
 Ramnagar Range, Udham Singh Nagar, a village in Bajpur Taluk, Udham Singh Nagar district
 Ramnagar Jaspur, a village in Jaspur Taluk, Udham Singh Nagar district
 Ramnagar Kashipur, a village in Kashipur Taluk, Udham Singh Nagar district
 Ramnagar Danda, a village in Rishikesh Taluk, Dehradun district
 Ramnagar, Hardwar, a village in Roorkee Taluk, Hardwar district

West Bengal 
 Ramnagar, Diamond Harbour, a village in South 24 Parganas district
 Ramnagar, Kulti, a town in Paschim Bardhaman district, West Bengal
 Ramnagar, Pandaveswar, a town in Paschim Bardhaman district, West Bengal
 Ramnagar, Purba Medinipur, a village in Purba Medinipur district, West Bengal, India
 Ramnagar I, a community development block
 Ramnagar II, a community development block
 Ramnagar, Purba Medinipur (Vidhan Sabha constituency), in Purba Medinipur district, West Bengal
 Ramnagar, Murshidabad, a census town

Elsewhere in India 
 Ramnagar, Diglipur, a village in the Andaman Islands
 Ramnagar, Visakhapatnam, in Andhra Pradesh, a neighbourhood
 Ramnagar, West Champaran, Bihar
 Ramnagar, Paschim Champaran (Vidhan Sabha constituency), in West Champaran district
 Ramnagar, Madhya Pradesh, a former town
 Ramnagar (Pune) metro station
 Ramnagar, Hyderabad, Telangana, a suburb
 Ramnagar, Agartala, a locality in Tripura
 Ramnagar (Tripura Vidhan Sabha constituency)
 Ramnagar, Danta Ramgarh, a village in Rajasthan

Nepal 
Ramnagar, Kapilvastu
Ramnagar, Mahottari
Ramnagar, Nawalparasi 
Ramnagar, Saptari
Ramnagar, Sarlahi
Ramnagar Rural Municipality
Ramnagar, Parasi
Ramnagar Bhutaha
Ramnagar Mirchaiya

Pakistan 
 Rasulnagar, formerly known as Ramnagar, a town in Punjab
 Battle of Ramnagar

See also 
 Ramanagar (disambiguation)
 Rampur (disambiguation)